Bon Preu Group is a chain of supermarkets in Catalonia with more than 200 stores and €1 billion turnover, based in Les Masies de Voltregà (Osona, Catalonia, Spain). Founded in 1974 by the brothers Joan Font Fabregó and Josep Font Fabregó the company started as a self-service store in Manlleu.

In 1988, the company opened the first hypermarket, called Esclat, in Vilafranca del Penedès. A few years later they opened the first filling station, in 1995, in Malla. From 1998 to 2011, the company established a group of supermarkets of medium-sized called Orangutan that later on would be renamed as Bonpreu. In 2004, they opened the first meat processing plant and warehouse in Balenyà, powered by photovoltaic panels. In 2007, this meat processing plant would be enhanced with a cold store and a new type of fast convenience store was introduced, Bonpreu Ràpid. In 2010, the Bon Preu Group acquired the Spanish stores of the French group Intermarché.

In 2017, the Bon Preu Group employed more than 6,000 people and owned 221 stores: 123 Bonpreu supermarkets, 47 Esclat hypermarkets, 3 Iquodrive online delivery shops, 41 Esclatoil filling stations and 8 ministores. In 2016, the company increased its turnover to 1,077 million euros, a 9.2% more than the previous year, invested 103 million euros and had a net income of 36 million euros.

The company has supported local food production and, since 2015, Bon Preu introduced kilometre zero products in all their stores.

In 2021, it announced the construction of its second major logistics center at the Montblanc Intermodal Logistics Activities Center.

See also 
 Dia (supermarket chain)
 Hipercor
 Mercadona
 Eroski

References

External links 

 Bon Preu Group Webpage

Retail companies established in 1974
Companies established in 1974
Companies based in Catalonia
Supermarkets of Spain
Food and drink companies of Spain